North Wadgaon is a village in the Karmala taluka of Solapur district in Maharashtra state, India.
Around 12 Km from Tahsil Karmala, it is close to Mangi dam.

Demographics
Covering  and comprising 281 households at the time of the 2011 census of India, Wadgaon (N) had a population of 1330. There were 681 males and 649 females, with 188 people being aged six or younger.

References

Villages in Karmala taluka